"Swamped" is a song by the Italian gothic metal band Lacuna Coil. It was released as the second and final single from their third studio album Comalies. The song features a male and female vocal track, guitar-playing and orchestral string backing. The song is featured in the video game Vampire: The Masquerade - Bloodlines, and the movie Resident Evil: Apocalypse as part of the soundtrack. "Swamped" is available as a downloadable song for Rock Band. A music video was produced for the song.

Track listing
 Swamped (Album Version) - 3:46
 Swamped (Acoustic)  - 3:40

Music video
The music video for Swamped was released in June, 2004 and was shot between Sweden and Spain by Patric Ullaeus. It features the band performing in a desert (without male vocalist Andrea Ferro). Cristina Scabbia wears a black mini dress with long red and black ribbons wrapped around her hands. Then Andrea Ferro sings his part in a big mansion with large windows. In the last scene, the band walks out of the mansion into a garden.

Cover
Jana Kask (feat. Cram) covered "Swamped" during the second season of Estonian pop idol talent show.

Charts

Lacuna Coil songs
2002 songs
2004 singles
Century Media Records singles
Songs written by Andrea Ferro
Songs written by Cristina Scabbia
Nu metal songs